is a paralympic athlete from Japan who competes mainly in category T34 sprint events.

Noriko competed in the 100m and 200m at three consecutive Paralympics. In her first two games in 1996 and 2000, she won gold in the 100m and silver in the 200m on both occasions. In 2008, she won the bronze medal for the same event.

References

Paralympic athletes of Japan
Athletes (track and field) at the 1996 Summer Paralympics
Athletes (track and field) at the 2000 Summer Paralympics
Athletes (track and field) at the 2004 Summer Paralympics
Paralympic gold medalists for Japan
Paralympic silver medalists for Japan
Paralympic bronze medalists for Japan
Japanese female sprinters
Living people
Medalists at the 1996 Summer Paralympics
Medalists at the 2000 Summer Paralympics
Medalists at the 2004 Summer Paralympics
Year of birth missing (living people)
Paralympic medalists in athletics (track and field)
Japanese female wheelchair racers
20th-century Japanese women
21st-century Japanese women